Cristian Gómez is the name of:

Cristian Gómez (footballer, born 1987), Argentine footballer
Cristian Gómez (footballer, born 1989), Spanish footballer
Cristián Gómez (born 1978), Chilean footballer
Christian Gómez (born 1974), Argentine footballer
Christian Gómez (Venezuelan footballer) (born 1999)